Margin-infused relaxed algorithm (MIRA) is a machine learning algorithm, an online algorithm for multiclass classification problems. It is designed to learn a set of parameters (vector or matrix) by processing all the given training examples one-by-one and updating the parameters according to each training example, so that the current training example is classified correctly with a margin against incorrect classifications at least as large as their loss. The change of the parameters is kept as small as possible.

A two-class version called binary MIRA simplifies the algorithm by not requiring the solution of a quadratic programming problem (see below). When used in a one-vs-all configuration, binary MIRA can be extended to a multiclass learner that approximates full MIRA, but may be faster to train.

The flow of the algorithm looks as follows:

   Input: Training examples 
   Output: Set of parameters 

    ← 0,  ← 0
   for  ← 1 to 
     for  ← 1 to 
        ← update  according to 
        ← 
     end for
   end for
   return 

References

External links
adMIRAble - MIRA implementation in C++
Miralium - MIRA implementation in Java
MIRA implementation for Mahout in Hadoop

Classification algorithms